The Democratic Party of the City of Buenos Aires is a provincial conservative political party in Buenos Aires City, Argentina. It was founded around 1930.

It was member of the national Recreate for Growth electoral alliance led by Ricardo López Murphy.

It supports Mauricio Macri in Buenos Aires since 2003 and is an ally of Republican Proposal in this district. It is a sister party to the more successful Democratic Party in the province of Mendoza.

The Democratic Party recognizes as a reference the former provisional president of the Senate, Federico Pinedo.

References 

Provincial political parties in Argentina
Conservative parties in Argentina
Buenos Aires